Santiago Futsal, formerly known as Autos Lobelle de Santiago Fútbol Sala, is a professional futsal club based in Santiago de Compostela, Galicia.

The club was founded in 1975 and plays its home games at the Multiusos Fontes do Sar with a capacity of 5,500 seats.

History

The club was founded in 1975 by José Antonio Lobelle, owner of car company Autos Lobelle and still the club's chairman. In its early years, players were taken from the ranks of the company's employees.

Before 2012–13 season, the club changed its name to Santiago Football, modifying also its logo.

Sponsors
Autos Lobelle (1975–2009)
Xacobeo 2010 (2009–2011)
Autos Lobelle (2011–2012)

Season to season

13 seasons in Primera División
3 seasons in Segunda División
8 seasons in Segunda División B

Current squad

Trophies
European Futsal Winners Cup: 1
Winners: 2007
Copa de España: 1
Winners: 2006
Supercopa de España: 1
Winners: 2010

Notable players
 Betão

References

External links
Official Website

 
Futsal clubs in Galicia (Spain)
Sport in Santiago de Compostela
Futsal clubs established in 1975
1975 establishments in Spain